Shraga Bar (born March 24, 1948) is a former Israeli football defender who played for the Israel national team between 1968 and 1972. He was part of the team for the Israel squad in the 1970 World Cup.

At club level, Bar played for Maccabi Netanya and Hapoel Ramat Gan.

External links
 
 

1948 births
Living people
Israeli footballers
Association football defenders
Israel international footballers
Olympic footballers of Israel
Maccabi Netanya F.C. players
Hapoel Ramat Gan F.C. players
Footballers from Netanya
Liga Leumit players
Footballers at the 1968 Summer Olympics
1970 FIFA World Cup players